The Ministry of Transport is one of the ministries of the Iraqi government, and specializes in transport and communications it is currently headed by Kadhim Finjan.

References

Government ministers of Iraq